USS Caledonia may refer to the following ships of the United States Navy:

 , was captured off Fort Erie, Ontario, 8 October 1812, purchased by the Navy on 6 February 1813 and sold May 1815.
 , was an  cargo ship, which served from 1945 until 1946.

United States Navy ship names